Hallesche Beiträge zur Orientwissenschaft is an academic journal of oriental studies published by the Martin Luther University of Halle-Wittenberg. The editors are Markus Mode and Jürgen Tubach. It was founded in 1979 by Burchard Brentjes, Manfred Fleischhammer, and Peter Nagel, who were the joint editors in its early years. It is published on an irregular schedule.

External links 
Catalog entry of the German National Library (de)
Martin Luther University Halle-Wittenberg library catalog entry (de)
Scanned copies of all published articles from the publisher (de)

Academic journals published in Germany
German-language journals
Ancient Near East journals
Oriental studies
Martin Luther University of Halle-Wittenberg
Publications established in 1979
Irregular journals